Cedar Grove station is a light rail station on the Ashmont–Mattapan High Speed Line (part of the MBTA Red Line) located in the southern part of the Dorchester neighborhood of Boston, Massachusetts. The station, named for the adjacent Cedar Grove Cemetery, has two side platforms serving the line's two tracks. It is accessible via wooden ramps on both platforms.

The station agent died of rabies in November 1908 after being bitten by a dog which had found its way into the station.

Cedar Grove was closed on June 24, 2006, for a yearlong renovation of the Ashmont–Mattapan High Speed Line. It was reopened on December 22, 2007.

References

External links

 MBTA - Cedar Grove
 Station from Google Maps Street View

Dorchester, Boston
Red Line (MBTA) stations
Railway stations in Boston
Railway stations in the United States opened in 1929
1929 establishments in Massachusetts